Maximum Fun is an independent podcast and radio show production organization founded and run by Jesse Thorn. The organization originated with Thorn's college radio show The Sound of Young America which continued in an adapted format and with a new name, Bullseye with Jesse Thorn. Maximum Fun has since grown to include several other programs.

In May 2014, Rolling Stone included three Maximum Fun shows on its list of "The 20 Best Comedy Podcasts Right Now": Judge John Hodgman, RISK!, and Throwing Shade.

Current shows

The Adventure Zone

The Adventure Zone is an actual play podcast in which Griffin, Justin, and Travis McElroy play Dungeons & Dragons and other role-playing games with their father, Clint.

The Art of Process with Aimee Mann and Ted Leo

Baby Geniuses
Baby Geniuses is a weekly podcast hosted by comedian Emily Heller and cartoonist Lisa Hanawalt. The first episode was released on August 22, 2012, and the show joined Maximum Fun on September 29, 2014. The show currently features segments "Chunch Chat," "Endorse Horse," "One on Fun," "What Did I Learn," and "Butt Pics," in addition to "Wiki of the Week," which forms the bulk of the podcast. Former segments include "Expert Hour," where improv comedians would extemporaneously lie about a topic of interest.

Beef and Dairy Network Podcast

Beef and Dairy Network Podcast is a surrealist comedy podcast hosted by Benjamin Partridge, taking the form of a serious companion podcast to a fictional beef and dairy industry trade magazine relating the bizarre happenings in the aforementioned industries.

Bubble

Bubble is a scripted science fiction comedy that premiered June 13, 2018. From the Maximum Fun website, "Welcome to Fairhaven, a literal Bubble of corporate utopia set amid the wild, goblin-infested Brush. The first scripted comedy series from Maximum Fun, Bubble tells a tale that is both contemporary and otherworldly, as a small band of monster killers struggles to make ends meet and find love in a nightmarish version of the gig economy."

Starring: Alison Becker (Parks and Recreation), Keith Powell (30 Rock), Cristela Alonzo (Cristela), Eliza Skinner (The Late Late Show) and Mike Mitchell (Love), with appearances by Judy Greer, John Hodgman, Martin Starr, Paul F. Tompkins, and many more.

Bullseye with Jesse Thorn

Bullseye, formerly The Sound of Young America, began as an interview, talk, and sketch comedy radio show at the University of California Santa Cruz.<ref name="avclub">{{cite web|url=http://www.avclub.com/article/jesse-thorn-of-emthe-sound-of-young-americaem-and--54342|title=Jesse Thorn of The Sound of Young America" and "Jordan, Jesse Go!"|last=Byrne|first=Matt|date=April 12, 2011|work=AV Club|access-date=October 4, 2014}}</ref> It now follows an interview-only format and is available both as a podcast and via National Public Radio on numerous public radio stations across the United States.

Can I Pet Your Dog?Can I Pet Your Dog? is a comedy podcast on dogs originally hosted by "small dog owner" (formerly just "dog owner") Allegra Ringo, "big dog owner" (formerly "dog wanter") Renee Colvert, and producer Alexis B. Preston. The hosts discuss dogs among themselves and their guests. Allegra Ringo left the show in April 2019 and was replaced as co-host by Alexis Preston.

The Dave Hill Goodtime Hour
A weekly podcast recorded live every Monday at 8pm ET on Twitch, hosted by comedian Dave Hill alongside producers/sidekicks James "Dez" Fernandez and Chris Gersbeck, similar to Hill's former WFMU radio show The Goddamn Dave Hill Show. Guests on the program have included Steve Agee, Jonah Ray, Tom Papa, Negin Farsad, Mary Jo Pehl, Mike Sacks, Christian Finnegan, Puddles Pity Party, Frank Conniff, Trace Beaulieu, Tom Scharpling, Trevor Moore, Dave Wyndorf, Jason Narducy, Curtis Stigers, Charlie Tahan, Wayne Federman, Kathy Valentine, Paul Myers, Kevin Allison, Anuvab Pal, Myq Kaplan and more.

Dead Pilots Society
Dead Pilots Society presents readings of television pilots that for various reasons were never produced, picked up, or aired. Before the reading, the hosts interviews the writer or writers of the script about the script and the circumstances surrounding its initial creation or production.

From the Maximum Fun website, "In Dead Pilots Society, scripts that were developed by studios and networks but were never produced are given the table reads they deserve. Starring actors you know and love from television and film, a live audience, and a good time in which no one gets notes, no one is fired, and everyone laughs. Presented by Andrew Reich (Friends; Worst Week) and Ben Blacker (The Writers Panel podcast; co-creator, Thrilling Adventure Hour)."

Notable PilotsC-Compay by Steve Agee & Rob SchrabAllah in the Family by Reza Aslan & Andrew ReichRabbit Hole by Jamie Denbo & Kerri Kenney-SilverGalaxy Fighters by Victor FrescoAngry Angel by Will GluckPunching Out by Jonathan Goldstein & John Francis DaleyAirport Marriott by Phil Hay & Matt ManfrediOnly Child by John HodgmanTuned by Deborah Kaplan & Harry ElfontFront Man by Emily KapnekTotally Laime by Elizabeth Laime, story by Elizabeth Laime and Tami SagherFormosa by Thomas Lennon & Robert Ben GarantAssisted Loving by Claudia LonowWunderland by Amanda Lund & Matt GourleyRed State Blue State by Adam McKay & Chris HenchyBachelor Party by JJ Philbin & Josh MalmuthBig by Mike Royce & Kevin BiegelJetpackula by Rob SchrabThe Money Pit by Justin SpitzerThe Housewives by Casey Wilson & June Diane Raphael

Depresh Mode with John Moe

Depresh Mode with John Moe, honest, humane conversations with top artists, entertainers, and experts about what it's like to live with an interesting mind. No shame, no stigma, and more laughs than you might expect from a mental health podcast. John Moe started Depresh Mode in March 2021.

Both Depresh Mode and its predecessor, The Hilarious World of Depression, aim to remove the stigma surrounding mental health through frank and sometimes funny conversations about the struggles of daily life with depression and other mental health conditions. Depresh Mode, produced in partnership with Maximum Fun, allows Moe to expand beyond depression to cover topics like burnout, obsessive-compulsive disorder and how to navigate mental health apps.

 Dr. Gameshow 
A podcast where Jo Firestone and Manolo Moreno play listener-submitted games with comedian friends and listener call-ins.

FANTIFANTI is a weekly podcast where journalists Tre'vell Anderson and Jarrett Hill bring their pop culture and political expertise to things they enjoy and stand up against. The first episode aired on February 6, 2020.

The Flop HouseThe Flop House is a bi-weekly film review podcast hosted by Elliott Kalan, Dan McCoy, and Stuart Wellington. The hosts watch a "questionable" movie before each episode and then discuss its merits and shortcomings. It became part of the Maximum Fun network on September 29, 2014.

Go Fact YourselfGo Fact Yourself is a trivia game show podcast hosted by J. Keith van Straaten and co-hosted by Helen Hong. Each show features two guests that compete in a variety of trivia rounds, including a topic they choose for themselves.

The Greatest GenerationThe Greatest Generation is a weekly comedy podcast in which hosts Adam Pranica and Benjamin Harrison describe and review episodes of Star Trek: The Next Generation, Star Trek: Deep Space Nine, and Star Trek: Voyager.

Greatest Trek

A spin-off of The Greatest Generation, Greatest Trek (named The Greatest Discovery from 2016–2022) is a comedy podcast in which hosts Adam Pranica and Benjamin Harrison describe and review Star Trek: Discovery, Star Trek: Picard, Star Trek: Lower Decks and Strange New Worlds.

Heat RocksHeat Rocks is a podcast co-hosted by film and TV music supervisor Morgan Rhodes and music critic and historian Oliver Wang in which the pair invite a different guest each week to talk about one of the guest's favorite albums. Beginning in 2017, the podcast has covered albums in many genres of popular music including hip hop, soul, R&B, synth pop, funk, disco, punk rock, folk, bossa nova and jazz, often avoiding the typical canon of critic faves and hits in favor of more slept-on cult favorites. Heat Rocks also included special episodes on soundtracks, sampling culture and feminist icons. A few artists have received more than one episode devoted to their music. Prince is the artist most often covered on the podcast, with six albums covered. Guests on the podcast range from musicians and artists to journalists and academics. Artists such as Meshell Ndegeocello, Ali Shaheed Muhammad and Nite Jewel have guested on Heat Rocks.

Inside Pop
From Maximum Fun website: "Inside Pop is the weekly podcast that dives deep inside the world of pop culture. Television producers Amita Patel and Sean David Johnson bring their knowledge of the entertainment industry and their passion for pop culture to cover the stories you need to know about and care about. Together this dynamic duo brings a welcome diversity (they are African American and Indian American; Male and Female, Gay and Straight, Married and Single and wannabe residents of Sunnydale, CA and Dillon, TX) into the pop culture podcasting landscape."

Jordan, Jesse, Go!

A talk podcast where hosts Jesse Thorn and Jordan Morris and usually a guest provide a comedic take on a variety of topics. The podcast's all time number one guest by appearances is "Big Time" Gene O'Neill.

Judge John Hodgman

Stemming from a popular segment on Jordan, Jesse, Go!, Judge John Hodgman debuted as a standalone Maximum Fun podcast in November 2010. Hodgman serves as judge and jury, hearing cases brought by listeners on topics ranging from which kind of soap goes in the dispenser on the sink to whether a high schooler is responsible for the theft of a life-sized Ernie doll that he had previously stolen. Jesse Thorn serves as the "bailiff," though this role is occasionally filled by guest bailiffs when Jesse is preoccupied.

Minority KornerMinority Korner is a discussion of pop culture, politics, and nostalgia through the lens of race, gender, and queer experiences. It's hosted by Nnekay FitzClarke and James Arthur, with new episodes released every Friday.

My Brother, My Brother and Me

On January 17, 2011, Jesse Thorn announced the addition of My Brother, My Brother and Me to the Maximum Fun family. The show is a comedy program that poses as an advice podcast, hosted by real-life brothers Justin, Travis, and Griffin McElroy. Over the course of the show, the brothers answer two types of questions: the real questions, in which listeners of the show write in, asking the brothers for their advice on a certain situation; and the more humorous, ridiculous questions from Yahoo! Answers, which are also sent in by listeners. The brothers often refer to the latter as "Yahoos."My Brother, My Brother and Me has featured notable guests answering questions, including Patrick Rothfuss, Elizabeth Gilbert, Lin-Manuel Miranda, John Roderick, Dan Savage, Jimmy Buffett, and Jesse Eisenberg. These guests are usually billed as "guestperts."

Oh No, Ross and Carrie!Oh No, Ross and Carrie! joined the Maximum Fun network in January 2014. The hosts, Ross Blocher and Carrie Poppy, personally investigate claims about spirituality, fringe science, religion, and the paranormal, then discuss their findings on the show. They have investigated a number of religious groups, fringe science claims, and alternative medicine modalities, including Mormonism, dowsing, and Reiki healing. The motto of the podcast is "We show up so you don't have to."

One Bad MotherOne Bad Mother is a weekly podcast hosted by Theresa Thorn and Biz Ellis. It is a comedy podcast about the realities of parenting. Episodes typically feature an interview with a guest on a specific topic. Additionally, each episode has a segment called Genius and Fails where Biz and Theresa share their parenting wins and failures from the week. Listeners call into a hotline to leave their own genius moments, fails, or rants. The episodes end with the listener rants in the Mom Having a Breakdown segment.

Reading GlassesReading Glasses is a weekly podcast hosted by Brea Grant and Mallory O'Meara. It discusses tips and tricks for reading better, like how to vanquish that To-Be-Read pile and organize those bookshelves, climbing out of a reading slump, and supporting authors while still getting books on the cheap.

SawbonesSawbones, "a marital tour of misguided medicine," is a podcast hosted by Sydnee McElroy, a physician, and her husband Justin McElroy, who is also a co-host of My Brother, My Brother, and Me. The weekly show is a humorous exploration of medical history, focusing on the many ways the medical community has been wrong in the past. It premiered on the Maximum Fun network on June 21, 2013, with an episode about trepanation.

Secretly Incredibly FascinatingSecretly Incredibly Fascinating is a weekly podcast hosted by Alex Schmidt that dives into topics that have a fascinating history.  Topics include Lorem Ipsum, Silica Gel Packets and Paperclips.  This is a podcast for people who like history, science, comedy and seeing their world a whole new way.

ShmannersShmanners is a weekly podcast hosted by Travis McElroy (of My Brother, My Brother and Me) and his wife, Teresa McElroy. The show focuses on teaching proper manners and etiquette, as well as the history behind various social guidelines. The podcast was launched in January 2016.

Still BufferingStill Buffering is a weekly podcast hosted by real-life sisters Sydnee McElroy (of Sawbones) and Rileigh Smirl, with their other sibling Teylor Smirl becoming a regular co-host in later episodes. The show focuses on experiences and issues faced by teenagers, comparing and contrasting those of current teen Rileigh with her older siblings' memories of their own teenage years. The show was first launched on Maximum Fun in January 2016. In 2020, the show was retooled to instead focus on the siblings analyzing pop culture and media that influenced each of them as teenagers.

Stop Podcasting YourselfStop Podcasting Yourself is a weekly comedy podcast hosted by Graham Clark and Dave Shumka. Each week the comedy duo invites a guest onto the program for a conversational interview. It is sometimes referred to by its acronym—pronounced "spy"—and its listeners are referred to as "bumpers" after Dave mistakenly referred to the audience that way in episode 1.

Switchblade Sisters
A podcast hosted by April Wolfe providing deep dives into genre (i.e., horror, science fiction, exploitation) films from a female perspective. Each episode provides a conversation between film critic April Wolfe and a woman working as a writer, actor, and/or director in the film industry.

Tights and FightsTights and Fights is a weekly professional wrestling podcast hosted by Hal Lublin, Danielle Radford, Open Mike Eagle and Lyndsey Kelk, and produced by Julien Burell. They wrap up the week in wrestling focusing on the storylines of WWE, as well as highlighting some of their favourite things in wrestling. In a 2017 article, The Comeback stated: "These are people who genuinely enjoy pro wrestling from a storytelling perspective, but who also want to dig into what's going on behind the scenes and off-screen as well."

Triple ClickTriple Click is a podcast hosted by Kirk Hamilton, Maddy Myers, and Jason Schreier, the former hosts of Kotaku's podcast Splitscreen. Every week, they discuss video-game related topics.

Troubled WatersTroubled Waters (formerly International Waters) pits two teams of comedians compete against each other in order to settle their meaningless debates once and for all. The show originated as a comedy panel game hosted by Dave Holmes. The show features comedians from the US competing against UK-based comedians by answering questions about pop culture. Points are awarded for correct answers as well as for funny incorrect answers. The show was originally hosted by Jesse Thorn.

We Got This with Mark & HalWe Got This is a comedic debate-style podcast hosted by Thrilling Adventure Hour alumni Hal Lublin and Mark Gagliardi. In it suggestions are given for topics of discussion via social media, and the two hosts (And occasionally a special guest.) engage in an episode-long debate before reaching a final agreement meant to (jokingly) settle the argument permanently. Topics have ranged from "Best or Worst" scenarios (ex: "Best Halloween Candy", "Worst Christmas Song", "Best Season") to debates focused singularly on two outcomes. (ex: "Calling or Texting", "Batman or Superman", "Baths or Showers") After a decision has been reached Hal Lublin closes the show with an improvised speech addressing the "People of the World" with their verdict. Occasionally the two will engage in "Clean Slate" episodes, which consist of "lightning round"-style quick takes on multiple topics they wouldn't otherwise have enough material to make a full episode out of.

Guests on the program have included notable comedians, musicians, authors, professional wrestlers, celebrities of geek/nerd culture, and numerous others. Frequently the show will feature fellow alumni of Thrilling Adventure Hour's "WorkJuice Players" collective as well as fellow podcasters as guests. Their theme song was written and performed by musical comedian/composer Mike Phirman.

 Notable We Got This with Mark & Hal guests 

Carlos Alazraqui ("Pirates vs Vikings")Trace Beaulieu of Mystery Science Theater 3000 ("Best Classic Movie Monster")River Butcher ("Best Sports Movie")Colt Cabana ("Best Pie")Frank Conniff of Mystery Science Theater 3000 ("Best Classic Movie Monster")Bill Corbett of Mystery Science Theater 3000 ("Best Classic Movie Monster")Jonathan Coulton ("Best Novelty Song")John DiMaggio ("Best Cuisine")Paul Dooley ("Chaplin or Keaton")Cameron Esposito ("Best Sports Movie")Nathan Fillion ("Best Film Trilogy")Ralph Garman ("Best Cheesesteak")Jean Grae ("Best Cuisine")Doc Hammer of The Venture Brothers ("Best Star Trek Film", "Clean Slate IV", "Best Classic Muppet Movie")John Hodgman ("Best Halloween Candy", "Star Wars or Star Trek", "Best Muppet Show Episode", "Best Cuisine",)Ted Leo ("Best Breakfast Cereal")Clint McElroy of The Adventure Zone ("Best Hanna-Barbera Cartoon")Travis McElroy of My Brother, My Brother, and Me ("Batman vs Superman", "Best Mel Brooks Film")Busy Philipps ("Best M&M Variety")Jackson Publick of The Venture Brothers ("Best Saturday Morning Cartoon", "Clean Slate IV" )Adam Savage ("Star Wars or Star Trek")Dana Snyder ("Best Disney Parks Ride")Paul F. Tompkins ("Calling or Texting")Janet Varney ("Best Vintage Toy")Billy West ("Best Stooge")Wil Wheaton ("Clean Slate III")Xavier Woods ("Best Classic Arcade Game")"Weird Al" Yankovic ("Best Monty Python Song")Maximum FilmMaximum Film  is a spinoff of retired Maximum Fun podcast Wham Bam Pow, hosted by Ify Nwadiwe and with regular panel members Drea Clark and Alonso Duralde. The podcast features discussion of recent hit films through a racially diverse lens with rotating guests. Former regular panel members include host Ricky Carmona and April Wolfe.

Wonderful!Wonderful! is a weekly podcast hosted by Griffin McElroy and his wife Rachel McElroy. The podcast features the hosts discussing a diverse assortment of things they love, with showcases of submitted topics that listeners are excited about. The podcast launched September 6, 2017, as a replacement for Rose Buddies.

 Limited series 
I, Podius
On each Episode of I, Podius, the hosts John Hodgman and Elliott Kalan discussed an episode of the 1970's BBC miniseries I, Claudius.  They also interviewed several cast members of the miniseries.  Originally a bonus podcast for donors of Maximum Fun, it was released publicly on a weekly basis from February 2020 to May 2020.

Magic Lessons with Elizabeth Gilbert
Author Elizabeth Gilbert provides advice based on her book Big Magic. Guest experts include Neil Gaiman, Gary Shteyngart, Amy Purdy, Michael Ian Black, Brandon Stanton, Martha Beck, and Glennon Doyle Melton.

Round SpringfieldRound Springfield is a Simpsons-adjacent 20-episode limited series podcast hosted by Allie Goertz and Julia Prescott. The hosts interview writers, directors, showrunners, and voice-actors from the Simpsons-verse on their various paths to Springfield — failed pilots, other projects, and beyond. Notable guests include David X. Cohen, Josh Weinstein, and Yeardley Smith.

The show was reformatted from the original podcast Everything's Coming Up Simpsons, a weekly show where the hosts interview comics, writers, animators and show creators about their favorite episode of The Simpsons. The show joined the network in March 2018.

The TurnaroundThe Turnaround was a series where Jesse Thorn interviewed other professional interviewers to gain insight into interviews and "how and why they do what they do."  Guests included Katie Couric, Ira Glass, and Werner Herzog. The series ran from June 2017 to January 2018.

The Outer Reach: Stories from BeyondThe Outer Reach was a limited scifi anthology series meant to imitate the style of science fiction of the 50s and 60s.  Originally a bonus feed for donors of Maximum Fun, it was released publicly on May 8, 2020.

Retired programs

Adam Ruins EverythingAdam Ruins Everything was an interview podcast hosted by Adam Conover where he talked to the experts and people who appeared on the TV show by the same name. The last episode was released in November 2017.

Coyle and Sharpe: The Imposters
This show was a series of rebroadcasts of audio comedy pranks performed and recorded by Jim Coyle and Mal Sharpe in the 1960s. Coyle and Sharpe met in 1959 in a San Francisco boarding house and hatched a plan to make a living performing pranks. Using a hidden tape recorder, they recorded themselves doing comedic interviews with people on the streets of San Francisco. Some of these recordings were released by Warner Bros. Records as an LP. The duo also had a nightly radio show on KGO Radio. Many of the recordings were preserved by Mal Sharpe's daughter, Jennifer Sharpe, and these form the basis of the podcast. Maximum Fun released 100 episodes of the show from March 2007 to September 2010.

Dave Hill's Podcasting Incident
From the Maximum Fun website: "This incredible podcast features comedian/musician/writer/actor/artist/man-about-town/thinking man Dave Hill sitting down and having a delightful conversation with various notable people, including but not limited to fellow comedians, musicians, actors, authors, supermodels, convicts and whoever else he can talk into it." The podcast has since been revived by Hill as an independently produced show.

Friendly FireFriendly Fire was a weekly war movie review podcast hosted by John Roderick, Adam Pranica and Benjamin Ahr Harrison. The podcast launched on January 12, 2018. It went on a brief hiatus in January 2021 following controversial comments made by Roderick on Twitter, before announcing it would not be returning.

The Kasper Hauser Podcast
Selections of sketch comedy performed by the Kasper Hauser comedy group.

Mission to Zyxx

A longform improv science fiction space opera radio drama that parodies various science fiction media properties. The cast are veteran comedians from groups like the Upright Citizens Brigade, and the show was co-created by Allie Kokesh, Alden Ford, Winston Noel, Moujan Zolfaghari, Jeremy Bent and Seth Lind, a staff member on This American Life and Serial.  The plot concerns a motley crew of ambassadors, and each week a comedian guest appears and helps to shape that week's story. All improvised references are subsequently incorporated into the show's mythos. Guest stars have included Sasheer Zamata, Jon Gabrus, Alison Becker, Lennon Parham, and Bobby Moynihan. The series finale premiered in September 2022.

Pop RocketPop Rocket was a discussion of pop culture hosted by comedian Guy Branum developed as a chat show counterpart to Bullseye with Jesse Thorn. The regular panel included Wynter Mitchell, Karen Tongson, and Margaret Wappler. Combining comic, journalistic, academic and digital media expertise, the Pop Rocket team discussed what's most exciting in pop culture that week. Generally the panel explores issues with diversity, feminism, sociology and provide music recommendations called "That's My Jam" and select topics "I'm All About..." of what they were most interested in from the prior week. In May 2019, Pop Rocket ceased production due to the departures of host Guy Branum and panelist Margaret Wappler, declining listenership, and production costs.

Rendered

Rendered, hosted and produced by Julie Sabatier, was a monthly public radio show and podcast about "do it yourself" culture and creativity. Rather than a how-to show of DIY projects, Rendered (formerly "Destination DIY") centered around creative people as well as the processes and resources used to create various skills, communities, and ideas. The shows featured in-studio interviews, recorded sounds from the field, and narration. It was distributed by Public Radio Exchange to several public radio stations in the US. The podcast was added to the Maximum Fun network on September 29, 2014. Rendered retired from publication on August 31, 2015.

Rose BuddiesRose Buddies was a weekly podcast hosted by Griffin McElroy (of My Brother, My Brother and Me) and his wife Rachel McElroy. The show featured the hosts recapping and discussing the most recent episodes of the television series The Bachelor, along with spinoff series such as The Bachelorette and Bachelor in Paradise. The podcast originally premiered in January 2016, later joining Maximum Fun in January 2017. Rose Buddies retired from publication on August 30, 2017, and was replaced with Wonderful!Story BreakStory Break was a weekly podcast hosted by Freddie Wong, Matt Arnold, and Will Campos, each episode the three constructed a hypothetical movie or TV show from various influences such as video games, breakfast cereals or board games. The podcast launched on November 17, 2017 and aired its last episode on October 8, 2021.

The Sound of Young America: The College YearsThe Sound of Young America was a college radio show on KZSC, the college radio station at the University of California, Santa Cruz.  The show was co-hosted by Jesse Thorn, Jordan Morris, and Jim Real (the "Master of Would You Rather").  The show included serious pieces (often interviews with comedians) and less serious banter and comedy bits.  The more serious elements were included in the subsequent "The Sound of Young America" podcast, now the Bullseye with Jesse Thorn radio program distributed by NPR and available as a podcast.  The less serious parts of the show were later resurrected as the Jordan Jesse, GO podcast.

Trends Like TheseTrends Like These was a weekly podcast hosted by Travis McElroy (of My Brother My Brother and Me and others), Brent Black, and writer Courtney Enlow in which the three spent each episode discussing and analyzing various topics and stories trending on online social media. The podcast was launched in May 2015, and later joined the Maximum Fun network in February 2016. The final episode aired in April 2020.

Wham Bam Pow

Former programs
Bunker Buddies with Andie and BenBunker Buddies with Andie and Ben is a comedy survival podcast hosted by comedian Andie Bolt and gear/tech expert Ben Ellis. Ellis had previously appeared as a guest on the show, and replaced Travis McElroy as the co-host in 2018. The hosts discuss survival strategies for "every single Apocalyptic scenario" they can think of. The show left Maximum Fun to be independently produced in 2019.

Getting Curious with Jonathan Van NessGetting Curious is a podcast where Jonathan Van Ness follows his varied interests into topics like menstrual cups, lupus, modeling, and mass extinction by talking to experts in those fields. The show premiered in 2015 and was retired from Maximum Fun on March 3, 2017. The show has since moved to Earwolf.

The GoosedownThe Goosedown hosted by comedians Kimberly Clark & Jasper Redd places an African-American spin on pop culture past and present. They are no longer on Maximum Fun.

Jonah RaydioJonah Raydio is a music podcast hosted by Jonah Ray. The show was initially part of the Nerdist podcast network, joined Maximum Fun in 2018, and left in 2019. The show is currently distributed by Sklarbro Country.

Lady to LadyLady to Lady is a podcast hosted by comedians Barbara Gray, Brandie Posey, and Tess Barker. Each week, Barbara, Brandie, and Tess, are joined by a guest for an unfiltered session of sleepover games, pop culture discussion, and hilarious admissions. Each episode ends with the earnest advice segment "Lady Problems." They are now hosted by Exactly Right Media.

The Memory Palace
The Memory Palace is a monthly historical podcast hosted by Nate DiMeo. The show joined Maximum Fun in July 2012. The show became independent in early 2015 and joined Radiotopia in June 2015.

Nobody Listens to Paula Poundstone
Nobody Listens to Paula Poundstone is an advice show where comedian Paula Poundstone, co-host Adam Felber, and guests use their unique comedic sensibilities to help navigate life in the 21st century. The show debuted on Maximum fun in 2018 and left in December 2019 to join Starburns Audio.

Risk!Risk! is a weekly podcast and live storytelling show hosted by writer and actor Kevin Allison. The show's official website describes Risk! as a place "where people tell true stories they never thought they'd dare to share in public". RISK! started as a weekly live storytelling series in August 2009 and the podcast is currently independently produced by Kevin Allison.

Throwing ShadeThrowing Shade is a weekly comedy podcast centered around discussions of pop culture, politics, gay rights, and issues important to women, hosted by Erin Gibson (a.k.a. "Feminasty") and Bryan Safi (a.k.a. "Homosensual"). Gibson and Safi are "equal-opportunity offenders," and their comedic repartee frequently features adult topics and a politically incorrect sense of humor, even as they explore serious cultural and political issues. The podcast launched on November 9, 2011, and on March 5, 2012, it was announced that Throwing Shade'' was joining the Maximum Fun podcast network. The podcast left the network in June 2017 and has since moved to the Earwolf network.

Other projects
Begun in 2009, an annual weekend convention where fans of Maximum Fun can spend time with Maximum Fun hosts and other celebrities held in Lake Arrowhead, CA. In fall 2012 MaxFunCon East was offered in the Poconos. The Atlantic Ocean Comedy and Music Festival (also known as boatparty.biz) was held in summer 2013 in lieu of Max Fun Con East.

References

External links

 
Podcasting companies